The 1958–59 SM-sarja season was the 28th season of the SM-sarja, the top level of ice hockey in Finland. 10 teams participated in the league, and Tappara Tampere won the championship.

Regular season

External links
 Season on hockeyarchives.info

Fin
Liiga seasons
1958–59 in Finnish ice hockey